Star Tower is a digital television and FM radio transmitting tower on Winton Road near North Bend Road in the College Hill neighborhood of Cincinnati, Ohio designed and built by the Landmark Tower Company. It is one of the tallest lattice towers in the world and the second tallest of the four that rise above 900 feet in Cincinnati, Ohio. The tower is owned by the Sinclair Broadcast Group, though the company owns an additional tower in Mount Auburn for its main station in the area, CBS affiliate WKRC-TV (next to WSTR and WKRC's studios).

History
In 1988, Hoker Broadcasting Company, then owner of WOFX-FM and WSTR-TV ("Star 64"), purchased a site in College Hill from a developer who had planned to build self-storage lockers. It was registered with FCC as Antenna Structure Registration (ASR) 1014132. The following year, nearby residents sued to stop the project out of concern that the tower would be an eyesore. Hoker settled with the group in 1991, agreeing to restrictions on how the land surrounding the tower could be developed. Landmark Tower Company completed the tower in October 1991. At the time, it was the tallest tower in Cincinnati and the tallest of its kind in the world.

Stations
An omnidirectional antenna atop Star Tower continues to transmit WSTR-TV, while a number of FM radio stations, including WREW, WGRR, and WYGY also broadcast from the tower. WRRM has a backup antenna located on this tower; their primary is on the WXIX tower closer to the center of Cincinnati.

Television
TV stations that transmit from Star Tower include the following:

Radio
FM stations that transmit from Star Tower Tower include the following:

See also 
 Lattice tower
 List of tallest freestanding steel structures
 List of famous transmission sites

References

External links

Radio masts and towers in Ohio
Buildings and structures in Cincinnati
Mass media in Cincinnati
Towers completed in 1991
1991 establishments in Ohio
Lattice towers